KYK or kyk may refer to:

 Karluk Airport (IATA and FAA LID code), Alaska, United States
 Kamayo language (ISO 639-3 language code), a language native to Philippines